The Indian locomotive class WDG-6G (GE ES57ACi) is a class of diesel-electric locomotive used by the Indian Railways for freight duty. The locomotive is a higher power variant of the WDG-4G locomotive which was also designed by General Electric. The design platform is based on the GE Evolution Series and features a 4-stroke 16-cylinder fully turbocharged engine which delivers around 6,000 horsepower. It is the only 6,000 HP Diesel electric locomotive at 23t/axle weight, making it the lightest locomotive in its category in the world.

Import and manufacture
Two units were produced by Wabtec's plant in Pennsylvania, United States, and delivered to India in 2019. Initially, a few will be made in USA. Under the 'Make in India' initiative of Indian Government, GE will manufacture all remaining units at its factory in Marhowra, Bihar. GE has also built maintenance sheds at Roza in UP and Gandhidham in Gujarat.

Field trials
The first two locomotives in the series, 69001 and 69002, were recently sent to South Central Railways' Maula Ali (MLY) Diesel Locomotive Shed. The locos underwent Confirmatory Oscillograph Car Run (COCR) trials on the Vikarabad – Parli section of South Central Railway  and were approved by Research Design and Standards Organisation for further field trials on the Dedicated Freight Corridor by Roza Locomotive Shed.

Locomotive sheds

See also

Indian locomotive class WDG-4G
List of diesel locomotives of India
Indian Railways
Rail transport in India

References

G-6G
Co-Co locomotives
Evolution Series WDG-6G
5 ft 6 in gauge locomotives
Railway locomotives introduced in 2019